The Rocky River is a minor river in Kahurangi National Park in the South Island of New Zealand.

It feeds into the Slate River which in turn feeds into the Aorere River.

References

Rivers of the Tasman District
Kahurangi National Park
Rivers of New Zealand